L'Auberge rouge (The Red Inn)  is a 2007 French comedy crime film directed by Gérard Krawczyk.  The film is a remake of the 1951 film L'Auberge rouge by Claude Autant-Lara, which was inspired by crimes that happened at Peyrebeille Inn.

Plot
In the 19th century, the Crouteux Inn, located in the Pyrenees mountains, is owned by Pierre and Rose Martin. The innkeepers regularly order their deaf-mute adopted son, Violet, to rob and murder their guests. One evening, a group of travelers take refuge in the inn after having trouble with their stagecoach. Among the travelers is Father Carnus, who is traveling with a novice to a local monastery. Pierre wants to kill the group and take their possessions, but after his deeply religious wife refuses to kill the priest, things go badly for the couple.

Cast

 Christian Clavier as Pierre Martin
 Josiane Balasko as Rose Martin
 Gérard Jugnot as Father Carnus
 Jean-Baptiste Maunier as Octave
 Sylvie Joly as Countess of Marcillac
 Anne Girouard as Marie-Odile de Marcillac
 Urbain Cancelier as Philippe de Marcillac
 François-Xavier Demaison as Simon Barbeuf
 Jean-Christophe Bouvet as Lawyer Rouget
 Laurent Gamelon as The woodcutter
 Christian Bujeau as The captain
 Juliette Lamboley as Mathilde
 Fred Epaud as Violet
 Jan Rouiller as Duflot
 Olivier Saladin as The coachman

References

External links

2007 films
2000s crime comedy films
French crime comedy films
2000s French-language films
Remakes of French films
2007 comedy films
Films directed by Gérard Krawczyk
2000s French films